Barrett is the second and final studio album of new material released by former Pink Floyd frontman Syd Barrett. Recording began at Abbey Road Studios on 26 February 1970, and lasted for 15 sessions until 21 July. The album was produced by Pink Floyd's David Gilmour and Richard Wright, who also contributed on bass and keyboards respectively, along with previous Madcap contributor Jerry Shirley on drums.

Barrett was released in November 1970 on Harvest in the United Kingdom, but failed to chart; it was re-released in 1974 as part of Syd Barrett, which was the first US issues of these LPs. No singles were issued from the album. It was remastered and reissued in 1993, along with Barrett's other albums − The Madcap Laughs (1970) and Opel (1988) − independently and as part of the Crazy Diamond box set. A newly remastered version was released in 2010.

Background
Initial sales of and reaction to Barrett's first solo album, The Madcap Laughs, were deemed sufficient by EMI to sanction a second solo album. On 24 February 1970, a month after releasing Madcap, Barrett appeared on John Peel's Top Gear radio show, where he performed only one song from the newly released album ("Terrapin"), three that would later be recorded for Barrett ("Gigolo Aunt", "Baby Lemonade", and "Effervescing Elephant"), and a one-off ("Two of a Kind", possibly written by Richard Wright). The session producers had no verbal contact with Barrett, having communication with him only via Gilmour. For the radio session, Gilmour and Humble Pie drummer Jerry Shirley accompanied Barrett on bass and bongos, respectively. The version of "Gigolo Aunt" recorded for the radio session (and later released on 1988's The Peel Session) was unfinished, as Barrett had sung the opening verse three times. Barrett played slide guitar on the radio version of "Baby Lemonade", with Gilmour on organ.

Two days later, he began working on his second album in Abbey Road Studios, with Gilmour as producer, and a trio of musicians: Richard Wright, Shirley and Gilmour himself. The main aim for the Barrett sessions was to give Barrett the structure and focus many felt was missing during the long and unwieldy sessions for The Madcap Laughs. Thus, the sessions were more efficiently run and the album was finished in considerably less time than The Madcap Laughs (six months, compared to Madcaps one year). On 6 June 1970, Barrett gave his one and only official solo performance, at the Olympia in Kensington, backed once more by Gilmour and Shirley. At the end of "Octopus", the fourth number of the set, Barrett baffled the audience and his backing musicians by abruptly taking off his guitar and walking off stage.

Recording

The first session was on 26 February, three of the first songs—fully recorded—attempted during the session were "Baby Lemonade", "Maisie" and "Gigolo Aunt". However, Gilmour thought they were losing the "Barrett-ness". After "Baby Lemonade" was attempted, 2 takes of "Maisie" were recorded before Barrett went into 15 takes of "Gigolo Aunt". The next day, two-track demos of "Wolfpack", "Waving My Arms in the Air", "Living Alone" and "Bob Dylan Blues", were recorded. The former two made it to the album; the latter two didn't. On the recording sheet, it lists Gilmour as having taken home a copy of the latter two, Gilmour later returned and took the master tapes too. Gilmour has since said "Those sessions were done so quickly. We were rushing to gigs every day and had to fit recording sessions in between. I probably took it away to have a listen and simply forgot to take it back. It wasn't intended to be a final mix. Syd knocked it off, I took a tape home." Despite some minor work made to "Gigolo Aunt", Barrett wouldn't return to Abbey Road Studios until 1 April, due to Pink Floyd working on their 1970 album, Atom Heart Mother. On various occasions, Barrett would "spy" on the band as they recorded the album. Again, Barrett recorded some work to a song, "Wolfpack", on the 3rd, before the sessions were postponed until 5 June, this time due to Gilmour and Wright going on tour in the US with Pink Floyd.

On the session of 5 June, Barrett managed to record an unknown number of two-track demos for three songs: "Rats", "Wined and Dined", and "Birdie Hop". The "Rats" demo recorded here, became the basis for the album master, and would later be overdubbed by musicians, despite the changing tempos. Two days later, on the 7th, Barrett recorded "Milky Way", "Millionaire", before being rounded off with overdubs for "Rats". "Millionaire" was originally titled "She Was a Millionaire", and was originally recorded by Pink Floyd. Barrett recorded two attempts at a backing track before abandoning it, and adding vocals. Yet another break in recording occurred, until 14 July, where Barrett recorded several takes of "Effervescing Elephant", while numerous overdubs were added to Barrett's "Wined and Dined" demo by Gilmour. Three takes of "Dominoes" ensued, with an unknown number of takes of "Love Song", "Dolly Rocker" and "Let's Split" were recorded. "Love Song" and "Dolly Rocker" were both overdubbed, the former being overdubbed from 17 to 21 July, but overdubs for the latter were wiped. On 21 July, Barrett worked on another Untitled track (later to be titled as "Word Song"), recording only one take, before recording 5 takes of the last new song to be recorded for Barrett: "It Is Obvious". Barrett worked on remakes of two tracks: "Maisie", and "Waving My Arms in the Air" (the latter now seguing into a new track, "I Never Lied to You").

Shirley said of Barrett's playing: "He would never play the same tune twice. Sometimes Syd couldn't play anything that made sense; other times what he'd play was absolute magic." Barrett's direction to the other musicians were limited to pronouncements like "Perhaps we could make the middle darker and maybe the end a bit middle afternoonish. At the moment it's too windy and icy".

Songs
Animals are a recurring item in not only the album, but Barrett's entire solo output.

Side one
"Baby Lemonade" is a blues folk tune. The intro was actually Barrett simply warming-up on guitar, that Gilmour had managed to record and placed it at the start of the album, making it seem like an intro to the song. The lyrics that describe the way for a person to kill time (such as the line "In the clock they sent / Through a washing machine"). The solo was performed by Barrett, not Gilmour as is often noted. A recurring theme in the album, starting with "Baby Lemonade", is the weather. Barrett performed the song twice, both times for the BBC (previously recorded on 24 February 1970, for John Peel's Top Gear, and later for Bob Harris' show on 16 February 1971).

"Love Song" tells the story of an ex-girlfriend fondly remembered ("I knew a girl and I like her still"). It is the first of two songs which feature dreamlike-senses in the lyrics ("I'll lay my head down and see what I see"). Barrett performed the song for Bob Harris' show in 1971.

"Dominoes" features imagery of regret and recollection in the lyrics. The song features a backwards guitar solo by Barrett, and organ and Wurlitzer by Wright. The song's "You and I" lyric refers to the tail end relationship Barrett had with Lindsay. The first of three songs on the album which lyrics point to anguish ("In my tears, my dreams"). Barrett performed the song for Bob Harris' show in 1971.

"It Is Obvious" is the second of two songs which feature dreamlike-senses in the lyrics ("Creep into bed when your head's on the ground"). It is also the second of three songs on the album which lyrics point to anguish ("Remember those times I could call / Through the clear day time / And you would be there"). The theme of weather is referenced again ("The softness, the warmth and the weather in suspense"). The song also references the Cambridge quarry pits, and the landscape.

"Rats" started off as a jam, but eventually evolved into a structured song. It contains taunting and maniacal lyrics ("Rats rats lay down flat / We don't need you we act like that").

"Maisie" is a blues jam, with Barrett muttering the lyrics.

Side two
"Gigolo Aunt" was performed by Barrett for Top Gear in 1970. For Barrett's only solo performance, at the Kensington Olympia in 1970, he played four songs, one of them being "Gigolo Aunt".

"Waving My Arms in the Air" contains an echo of "Octopus" ("Waving my arms in the air / Pressing my feet to the ground"). The lyrics refer to a hard-learned experience. The song features a childlike section ("No care / No no"). The song segues into "I Never Lied to You" with the aid of Wright's organ.

"I Never Lied to You" is the final of three songs on the album which lyrics point to anguish ("It's been so hard to bear with you not there").

"Wined and Dined" dated from Barrett's Cambridge days, and is about the relationship between Barrett and his then-girlfriend, Gayla Pinion, a model from Cambridge. The song reflects on about Mediterranean evenings ("Musk winds blow"), and hauntings of Barrett's childhood ("Chalk underfoot / Light ash of blue") evoked during a summer party he didn't want to leave. Dave Gilmour added a sinuous sliding lead over Barrett's vocals.

"Wolfpack" had been mentioned by Barrett in an interview, he said the song was one of favourites, out of all his material.

"Effervescing Elephant" was pastiche of the verse form of Hilaire Belloc's Cautionary Tales for Children. In contrast to "Dominoes", "It Is Obvious", "Rats", "Waving My Arms in the Air", and "Wolfpack" previously mentioning one or two animals, "Effervescing Elephant" contains references to a whole jungle full of animals. Barrett performed the song for Top Gear in 1970. For Barrett's only solo performance, at the Kensington Olympia in 1970, he played four songs, one of them being "Effervescing Elephant".

Release and aftermath

The cover of the album was designed by Barrett; it was originally one of many drawings Barrett had done in Cambridge, years earlier. Barrett was released in November 1970 to less interest than had greeted The Madcap Laughs earlier in the year, and as a result, failed to reach the chart. Talks of more singles and a third album were rumoured over the following months. Barrett dismissed the album and Madcap, saying: "They've got to reach a certain standard and that's probably reached in Madcap once or twice and on the other one only a little – just an echo of that. Neither of them are much more than that." Allmusic reviewer Ritchie Unterberger called the album "a bit fuller and smoother than the first album", referring to "Baby Lemonade", "Gigolo Aunt", and "Effervescing Elephant" as "among his peppiest and best-loved tunes"; however, "the tone is darker and more meandering" in the rest of the album. In an overview of Barrett's career, Rolling Stone referred to both Barrett's solo albums as "entrancing".

On 16 February 1971, Barrett recorded a short set for BBC Radio 1's Sound of the Seventies radio show; in contrast to 1970's radio appearance where Barrett performed new material, this time he played songs from Barrett: "Baby Lemonade", "Dominoes" and "Love Song". Bored and directionless, Barrett headed back to his hometown of Cambridge and – but for a brief dalliance with a band called Stars in 1972, and some abortive recording sessions in 1974 – left his music career behind for good.

The album was reissued in late 1974 with his first solo album The Madcap Laughs as record two of the two-record set Syd Barrett in Harvest's series of Harvest Heritage reissues. In 1993, Barrett (along with The Madcap Laughs and Opel) was reissued both independently and as part of the Crazy Diamond Barrett box set, on 26 April 1993. "Bob Dylan Blues" would later turn up on 2001's The Best of Syd Barrett: Wouldn't You Miss Me?. A newly remastered version was released in 2010. For release on An Introduction to Syd Barrett in 2010, Gilmour laid down a new bass track to four songs, only one from Barrett: "Dominoes".

Track listing
Original release

1993 reissue
This reissue splits "Waving My Arms in the Air" and "I Never Lied to You" into tracks 8 and 9 respectively.

Personnel
 Syd Barrett – lead and backing vocals, electric and acoustic guitars, painting
 David Gilmour – bass, 12-string guitar, slide guitar , additional organ, drums , production
 Richard Wright - Hammond organ, piano, harmonium, Wurlitzer electronic piano, tack piano, production
 Vic Saywell – tuba 
 Jerry Shirley – drums, percussion
 John "Willie" Wilson – drums, percussion

Technical personnel
 Peter Bown – engineering
Gareth Cousins – mixing on Crazy Diamond bonus tracks
Mick Rock – photography (uncredited)

ReferencesFootnotesCitations'

Syd Barrett albums
Harvest Records albums
EMI Records albums
1970 albums
Albums produced by David Gilmour
Capitol Records albums
Albums with cover art by Mick Rock
Albums produced by Richard Wright (musician)